Berneuil may refer to the following places in France:

Berneuil, Charente, a commune in the department of Charente
Berneuil, Charente-Maritime, a commune in the department of Charente-Maritime
Berneuil, Somme, a commune in the department of Somme
Berneuil, Haute-Vienne, a commune in the department of Haute-Vienne
Berneuil-en-Bray, a commune in the department of Oise
Berneuil-sur-Aisne, a commune in the department of Oise